Gandasi  is a  "hobli" in Hassan district of India.

Location
Gandasi village is located in Arsikere Taluk of Hassan district, Karnataka state, India.  The village comes on the highway between Mysore and Arsikere.

Postal code
There is a post office in Gandasi and the postal code is 573119.

Demographics
There are 4350 houses in Gandasi village [Hobli]. The total population of the village is 18000. near big village gundukanahalli

Image gallery

See also
 Arsikere
 Channarayapatna

References

Villages in Hassan district